Hastings/Sweetwater Farms Aerodrome  is located  northeast of Hastings, Ontario, Canada.

References

Registered aerodromes in Ontario